Börge Lennart Hellström (25 September 1957 – 17 February 2017) was a Swedish writer. A reformed criminal, he was perhaps best known as a founding member of the organisation Kriminellas revansch i samhället (KRIS). The organisation aims to combat crime and provide support to former criminals. He was also one half of the writing duo Roslund & Hellström. With journalist Anders Roslund, he co-authored seven books between 2004 and 2016.

Hellström lived in Värmdö Municipality. He died from cancer on 17 February 2017, at the age of 59.

References

1957 births
2017 deaths
Deaths from cancer in Sweden
Swedish crime fiction writers
Swedish criminals
Swedish male writers